Oberfeulen is a small town in the commune of Feulen, in central Luxembourg.  , the town has a population of 277.

Diekirch (canton)
Towns in Luxembourg